Lycée Alfred Kastler is a senior high school in Dourdan, Essonne, France, in the Paris metropolitan area.

History
The lycée professionnel de Dourdan opened in 1972. Its current building began construction in 1983, finished construction in January 1985, and opened in February 1985. It became a comprehensive (polyvalent) school in 1991.

References

External links
 Lycée Alfred Kastler 

1972 establishments in France
Educational institutions established in 1972
Lycées in Essonne